Steven Tyrone Daniel (born in Hartford, Connecticut) is an American actor and musician. He is best known for his role as Lionel "El-Train" Johnson on the NBC Saturday morning sitcom City Guys. After City Guys ended in 2001, he guest starred in NYPD Blue and Charmed in 2002 and 2003, respectively. He also appeared in a few independent films; his last acting credit was in the film The Least Likely Candidate (2004).

As a musician, Daniel released the gospel-influenced hip-hop album Hiphopcrisy (2001).

References

External links

20th-century American male actors
21st-century American male actors
American hip hop musicians
American male film actors
American male television actors
Musicians from Hartford, Connecticut
Male actors from Hartford, Connecticut
Living people
Year of birth missing (living people)